Till the Sun Turns Black is singer-songwriter Ray LaMontagne's second full-length release, which was released on August 29, 2006. The album was produced by Ethan Johns and recorded at Allaire Studios in Shokan, New York. The album was a commercial success, becoming a top 40 album, selling 28,000 copies in its first week of release. The album was released in the UK on June 18, 2007, where it peaked at No. 35 on the UK Albums Chart.

Track listing
All songs written by Ray LaMontagne.

 "Be Here Now" – 6:23
 "Empty" – 5:17
 "Barfly" – 3:55
 "Three More Days" – 3:36
 "Can I Stay" – 3:41
 "You Can Bring Me Flowers" – 4:12
 "Gone Away from Me" – 4:27
 "Lesson Learned" – 4:39
 "Truly, Madly, Deeply" – 1:52
 "Till The Sun Turns Black" – 4:28
 "Within You" – 5:43

Singles
 "Can I Stay" (promo only) (August 29, 2006)
 "Be Here Now" (June 18, 2007)
 "Three More Days" (August 20, 2007)

"Be Here Now" was the first British single from the album. It was released on limited edition 7" vinyl (limited to 500 copies only) on June 18, 2007 to coincide with the release of the album there. The B-side is a previously unreleased live version of "Be Here Now." It is also featured in the trailer for the 2006 motion picture Away from Her and in season 1 finale of Covert Affairs.

Personnel
Ray LaMontagne – vocals, acoustic guitar, electric guitar (6), Spanish guitar (8, 9), Rhodes piano (9)
Ethan Johns – drums (3, 4, 6, 11), percussion (2, 10), bass guitar (2, 3, 4, 6, 11), electric guitar (3, 4), ukulele (7, 11), dobro (6), acoustic bass (7), B3 (3), programming (6), piano/synthesizer (1), acoustic guitar/reed organ/harmony vocal (11)
John Medeski – Wurlitzer electric piano on "Three More Days"
Rachael Yamagata – background vocals on "Barfly"
Antoine Silverman – violin
Lorenza Ponce – violin
Chris Cardona – violin
David Gold – violin, viola
Jane Scarpantoni – cello
Dave Eggar – cello
Brad Jones – bowed bass (1, 10, 11)
Peck Allmond – trumpet (4, 6), euphonium/mellophone (7, 11), flute (6)
Michael Blake – tenor saxophone (4, 6)
Jack Schatz – euphonium (10)
Vincent Chancey – French horn (10)

Charts

Album

Certifications

References

External links
 

2006 albums
Ray LaMontagne albums
Albums produced by Ethan Johns